Georgeta Damian (married name Andruanche, born 14 April 1976 in Botoșani) is a female rower from Romania and winner of five Olympic gold medals. She married the rower Valeriu Andruanche in 2006.

Damian rowed in the Romanian Women's eight, that won the World Rowing Championships in 1997, 1998 and 1999, and the 2000 Summer Olympics, where she also won the Women's pairs. With Viorica Susanu, she won the World Championships in the pairs in 2001 and 2002, and at the 2004 Summer Olympics she won gold medals in both pairs and eights.  At the 2008 Summer Olympics, she won gold in the women's pairs with Susanu, and bronze in the eights.

Medals at Olympic Games
2008 Summer Olympics
 1st, Women's coxless pair
 3rd, Women's eight
2004 Summer Olympics
 
 1st, Women's eight
 1st, Women's coxless pair
2000 Summer Olympics
 1st, Women's Eight
 1st, Women's Pair

Medals at World Championships
1997
 1st, Women's Eight
 2nd, Women's Pair
1998
 1st, Women's Eight
1999
 1st, Women's Eight
2001
 1st, Women's Pair
 2nd, Women's Eight
2002
 1st, Women's Pair
2003
 2nd, Women's Eight
 3rd, Women's Pair

See also
List of multiple Olympic gold medalists

References

External links 
 
 
 
 

Olympic rowers of Romania
Rowers at the 2000 Summer Olympics
Rowers at the 2004 Summer Olympics
Rowers at the 2008 Summer Olympics
Rowers at the 2012 Summer Olympics
Olympic gold medalists for Romania
Olympic bronze medalists for Romania
Sportspeople from Botoșani
Living people
1976 births
Olympic medalists in rowing
Romanian female rowers
Medalists at the 2008 Summer Olympics
Medalists at the 2004 Summer Olympics
Medalists at the 2000 Summer Olympics
European Rowing Championships medalists